Louis Laurent Marie Clerc (26 December 1785 – 18 July 1869) was a French teacher called "The Apostle of the Deaf in America" and was regarded as the most renowned deaf person in American Deaf History.  He was taught by Abbé Sicard and deaf educator Jean Massieu, at the Institution Nationale des Sourds-Muets in Paris. With Thomas Hopkins Gallaudet, he co-founded the first school for the deaf in North America, the Asylum for the Education and Instruction of the Deaf and Dumb, on April 15, 1817, in the old Bennet's City Hotel, Hartford, Connecticut. The school was subsequently renamed the American School for the Deaf and in 1821 moved to 139 Main Street, West Hartford. The school remains the oldest existing school for the deaf in North America.

Biography
Laurent Clerc was born December 26, 1785, in La Balme-les-Grottes, Isère, a village on the northeastern edge of Lyon to Joseph-François Clerc and Marie-Élisabeth Candy in the small village of La Balme, where his father was the mayor. Clerc's home was a typical bourgeois household. When he was one year old, Clerc fell from a chair into a fire, suffering a severe burn and obtained a permanent scar on the right side of his cheek. Clerc's family believed his deafness and inability to smell were caused by this accident, but Clerc later wrote that he was not certain of this and might have been born deaf and without the ability to smell. The facial scar later provided the basis for his name sign, performed with the manual alphabet for "U", stroked twice downward on the right cheek. Clerc's name sign has become the best personal identifier in the American Deaf History. 
	 	
Clerc attended Institut National de Jeunes Sourds de Paris when he was just 12 years old and soon became a teacher there. While there, he was taught by Abbe Sicard and Jean Massieu who was deaf. In 1815 he traveled with Sicard and Massieu to England to give a lecture and happened upon Thomas Hopkins Gallaudet who was traveling in search of means for instructing deaf children. Gallaudet was invited to visit the school in Paris. Then in 1816, after a few months with Clerc at the school, Gaulladet invited Clerc to accompany him to the United States. During the trip across the ocean, Clerc learned English from Gallaudet, and Gallaudet learned sign language from Clerc. After arriving in America they worked together to establish the first permanent school for the Deaf in Hartford, Connecticut, which is now known as the American School for the Deaf.

Laurent Clerc died at the age of 83 at his home in Hartford.  The 1869 obituary in the New York Times says, Clerc came to Hartford in 1816 and became a teacher in 1817, then served more than 50 years "in the cause of deaf-mute instruction" and "his abilities, zeal, and graces of character made him always respected and loved." Clerc married one of the first pupils - Eliza Crocker Boardman.

Legacy
Generally, prior to the onset of organized education of the deaf, deaf people were regarded as unintelligent and incapable of education.  Laurent Clerc became one of the most recognizable figures in Deaf history of the United States thanks to his significant role in shaping deaf education. As a person who could not hear, nor speak from a young age and, despite this, acquired excellent command of spoken languages at an age far past the prime years for language acquisition he is also an exemplary personification of educability and high intellect.

Largely due to Clerc's contribution to the education of the Deaf in America several awards, buildings, funds, and other honors were named after him. Most notably at Gallaudet University

Film
Laurent Clerc is portrayed in the fictional film Sign Gene, the superhero film about deaf mutants who have superhuman powers through the use of sign language, as the fourth great-grandfather of the leading character Tom Clerc (played by Emilio Insolera). The film was released in September 2017.

Works 
"Autobiography of Laurent Clerc," Chapter III, in: Tribute to Gallaudet – A Discourse in Commemoration of the Life, Character and Services, of the Rev. Thomas H. Gallaudet, LL.D. – Delivered Before the Citizens of Hartford, Jan. 7th, 1852. With an Appendix, Containing History of Deaf-Mute Instruction and Institutions, and other Documents. By Henry Barnard, 1852. page 102.)
 The Diary of Laurent Clerc's Voyage from France to America in 1816 (West Hartford, CT: American School for the Deaf, 1952). 22 pages.
 An Address Written by Mr. Clerc and Read By His Request at a Public Examination of the Pupils in the Connecticut Asylum Before the Governour and Both Houses of the Legislature, 28 May 1818.
 Address at the Inauguration of Gallaudet University, 1864. 
"Reminiscences of Laurent Clerc," by L.C.T. Silent World, July 1871, pages 5–6. 
 "Visits to Some of the Schools for the Deaf and Dumb in France and England," American Annals of the Deaf:
 Volume 1, Number 1, October 1847 pages 62–66. 
 Volume 1, Number 2, January 1848, pages 113–120. 
 Volume 1, Number 3, April 1848, pages 170–176.

See also

American Sign Language
Bilingual-bicultural education
Deaf culture
Deafness medical, vs disability and cultural models
French Sign Language
Roch-Ambroise Auguste Bébian
Second International Congress on Education of the Deaf
William Stokoe

References

Further reading 
 Denison, James. The Memory of Laurent Clerc: Dedication Address for Clerc Memorial, American Annals of the Deaf, Volume 19, Number 4, October 1874, pages 238–244.
 Gallaudet, Edward Miner. Life of Thomas Hopkins Gallaudet – Founder of Deaf-Mute Instruction in America by Edward Miner Gallaudet, 1888. For information about Laurent Clerc, see pp. 92 and following.
 Irving, Washington (editor). The Deaf and Dumb in: Analectic magazine. May 1820 issue. Philadelphia, Pa.: Moses Thomas, pp. 419–431. [ Link] to Google books.
 Lane, Harlan. When The Mind Hears: A History of the Deaf, by Harlan Lane.  Chapter 1, "My New Family".
 Massieu, Jean; Laurent Clerc; and Roch Ambroise Cucurron Sicard. 1815.  Receuil des définitions et réponses les plus remarquables de Massieu et Clerc, Sourds-Muets, aux diverses questions qui leur ont étés faites dans les séances publiques de M. l'Abbé Sicard, à Londres. (A collection of the most notable definitions and responses of Massieu and Clerc, deaf and dumb, to the various questions put to them, at the public lectures of the Abbé Sicard, in London). Cox and Baylis, London, 1815.
 Porter, Samuel. Retirement of Mr. Clerc, American Annals of the Deaf, Volume 10, Number 3, July 1858, pages, 181–183.

External links

Clerc Memorial (bust) at the American School for the Deaf
Who was Laurent Clerc? (Clerc National Deaf Education Center web page)
Writings by and about Laurent Clerc (Gallaudet University Library web page)
Laurent Clerc Info Quest

Laurent Clerc Association
Diary of Laurent Clerc's Voyage From France to America in 1816
Laurent Clerc National Deaf Education Center
Laurent Clerc Cultural Fund (Gallaudet Univ. Alumni Assoc.)
Laurent Clerc Educational Fund, d/b/a Rocky Mountain Deaf School (RMDS)
About.com on Laurent Clerc
Laurent Clerc's grave site
Laurent Clerc obituary in the New York Times, July 19, 1869
Children's book: "Laurent Clerc – The Story of His Early Years"  by Cathryn Carroll
Laurent Clerc papers (MS 140). Manuscripts and Archives, Yale University Library.

1785 births
1869 deaths
People from Isère
Educators of the deaf
19th-century French people
Deaf culture in the United States
French expatriates in the United States